George Elrick (29 December 1903 – 15 December 1999), 'The Smiling Voice of Radio', was a British musician, impresario and radio presenter, probably best known for presenting the popular record request show Housewives' Choice during the 1950s and 1960s as well as his recording of the song "I Like Bananas Because They Have No Bones".

George Elrick was born in Aberdeen in 1903. His first ambition was to be a doctor but financial constraints prevented this. Still in his teens, he began playing drums for local dance bands and by 1928 had formed his own band, the Embassy Band, which swept the prizes in the All-Scottish Dance Band Championship that year. Elrick turned professional and moved to London where he became friends with the crooner Al Bowlly, and began singing himself. He joined the Henry Hall Orchestra as a vocalist and drummer and their 1936 recording of The Music goes Round and Round made Elrick a star. In 1937, he left Hall to form his own band, and in 1939 began a solo career, which was moderately successful through the years of World War II.

In 1948, he took a touring revue round Britain, and was asked by the BBC to stand in for two weeks as disc-jockey on the morning record request show Housewives' Choice.  The 'temporary' job lasted almost twenty years, as Elrick's Scottish accent and liberal use of catchphrases became highly popular. Memorably, he would sign off each show by singing the words 'I'll be with you all again tomorrow morning' to the (wordless) theme tune, and noting 'This is Mrs Elrick's wee son George saying thanks for your company - and cheerio!'.

In later years, he became something of an impresario and acted as an agent for numerous musicians such as Mantovani.

He was married and had a son. He published an autobiography, Housewives' Choice - The George Elrick Story.

References

External links 
 Obituary, The Independent, 17 December 1999

1903 births
1999 deaths
British radio presenters
British male drummers
People from Aberdeen
20th-century drummers
20th-century British male musicians